The Simca Rush engine was an Overhead valve Inline 4-cylinder engine produced by Simca at their Poissy Plant from 1960 until 1964 and was used in the Simca Aronde. The engine displaced 1290 cubic centimeters (1.3L) and featured an all new five-bearing crankshaft the engine produced up to 57 Hp (43 kW) in standard form, however the upgraded Rush Super M pumped out up to 70 Hp (53 kW).

The Rush engine was always backed by a 4-speed manual transmission, a rarity in the era.

References

See also 
 Simca
 Stellantis Poissy Plant
 Simca Aronde

Simca engines
Gasoline engines by model
Products introduced in 1960
Straight-four engines